Polyamory: Married & Dating is an American reality television series on the American pay television network Showtime.
The series follows polyamorous families as they navigate the challenges presented by polyamory. Polyamory Season 1 debuted on July 12, 2012, Season 2 premiered on August 15, 2013.

Cast
 Kamala Devi McClure (season 1—2)
 Jennifer Gold (season 1—2)
 Tahl Gruer (season 1—2)
 Michael McClure (season 1—2)
 Megan (season 2)
 Vanessa Carlisle (season 1)
 Anthony Cristofani (season 1)
 Lindsey Kate Cristofani (season 1)

Lindsey and Anthony are legally married to each other and are both in a relationship with Vanessa. These three are a primary relationship and refer to themselves as "the Triad". Kamala and Michael are legally married to each other, as are Jen and Tahl. The four of them refer to themselves as "the Pod".

Season 2 premiered on August 15. The pod of Kamala, Michael, Jen and Tahl is back with another new family.

Episodes

Season 1

Season 2

Critical response
In 2012, Gawker called Polyamory: Married & Dating the best reality show on television, "It works not just as the freak show that we've come to expect from reality TV, but also on a political level."

References

External links
 

2010s American reality television series
2012 American television series debuts
American LGBT-related reality television series
Polyamorous culture
Showtime (TV network) original programming
Television shows set in California
2010s LGBT-related reality television series